Tranier's tateril (Taterillus tranieri) is a species of rodent found in Mali and Mauritania. Its natural habitats are dry savanna, subtropical or tropical dry shrubland, and arable land.

References

Taterillus
Mammals described in 2003
Rodents of Africa
Taxonomy articles created by Polbot